Folk Blues is an album by blues musician John Lee Hooker, compiling tracks originally recorded for Modern Records between 1951 and 1954, that was released by the Crown label in 1962.

Reception
AllMusic reviewer Matt Fink stated: "Folk Blues is a rather average album in Hooker's vast catalog, but still a highly enjoyable piece... Overall, a very listenable collection."

Track listing
All compositions credited to John Lee Hooker
 "Baby I'm Gonna Miss You" – 2:33	
 "Half a Stranger" – 4:24	
 "Shake Holler And Run" – 2:31
 "Down Child" – 2:52
 "Gonna Boogie" — 2:24
 "Bad Boy" – 3:05	
 "Rock House Boogie" – 2:54	
 "Let's Talk It Over" – 3:01	
 "Baby You Ain't No Good" – 3:12	
 "Lookin' for a Woman" – 3:12
Recorded on August 7, 1951 (track 8), late 1952 (tracks 7 & 10), late 1953 (tracks 4-6), late 1954 (tracks 1, 2 & 9) and November 1954 (track 3)

Personnel
John Lee Hooker – guitar, vocals
Eddie Kirkland – guitar, vocals

References

John Lee Hooker albums
1962 albums
Crown Records albums